The first series of The Mighty Boosh was originally broadcast between 18 May 2004 and 6 July 2004. It features five main cast members: Julian Barratt, Noel Fielding, Rich Fulcher, Michael Fielding and Dave Brown, and centres on Howard Moon and Vince Noir (Julian Barratt and Noel Fielding), and the adventures they have whilst working at a zoo. A DVD of the series was released on 29 August 2005 in Region 2. Series 1 began to air in America on Adult Swim from 29 March 2009.

Overview

Setting
The series is set in a dilapidated zoo known as the "Zooniverse". Howard Moon and Vince Noir work there as zookeepers under manager Bob Fossil and owner Dixon Bainbridge. Naboo the Enigma also works there as the resident shaman. Howard and Vince often leave the Zooniverse for various adventures throughout the series, visiting locations such as Limbo, Monkey Hell, and the Arctic tundra.

Production
The BBC commissioned the series in May 2003. Rehearsals took place throughout 2003, and filming took place in Studio 11 of Three Mills Studios in London, England, from January 2004, directed by Paul King.  Certain scenes from the pilot were reused in the episode "Tundra".  The pilot was directed by Steve Bendelack. Episodes were shot on tape, then filmized in post-production; the outtakes on the DVD are presented raw, pre-filmization. Following series were shot digitally at 25 frames per second.

Reception
The series was a nominee for The Best Newcomer at the British Comedy Awards 2004.

Episodes
{| class="wikitable plainrowheaders" border="1" style="width:100%;"
|-
! style="background:#47ACE4; width:5%;"| No. inseries
! style="background:#47ACE4; width:5%;"| No. inseason
! style="background:#47ACE4;"| Title
! style="background:#47ACE4; width:35%;"| Directed by
! style="background:#47ACE4; width:25%;"| Original air date

|}

Notes

External links
 Series 1 at the BBC

The Mighty Boosh series
2004 British television seasons